&Twice (pronounced "and Twice") is the second Japanese studio album (third overall) by South Korean girl group Twice. It was released by Warner Music Japan on November 19, 2019. It features previously released singles "Happy Happy" and "Breakthrough", and the title track, "Fake & True". The group went on a tour in Japan to promote the album. A repackaged edition of the album, containing the new song "Swing", was released on February 5, 2020.

Background and release
On September 6, 2019, through their website, it was announced that Twice would release their second Japanese album. The title track "Fake & True" was pre-released as a digital single on October 18, along with the accompanying music video.

A repackage was released on February 5, 2020, adding a new song titled "Swing" along with a new version of the "Fake & True" music video called "The Truth Game".

Promotion
"Fake & True" was first performed during the Japanese leg of the Twicelights World Tour, which began on October 23, 2019, in Sapporo. It was also performed on Music Station on Music Station 2 Hour Special episode on November 22, 2019.

Commercial performance
&Twice debuted at number 1 on the daily ranking of Oricon Albums Chart with 80,563 copies sold, and topped the weekly Oricon Albums Chart with 124,197 copies sold. On Oricon Digital Album Chart, it debuted at number 5 with 1,912 download count. It also debuted atop the Billboard Japan Hot Albums chart, making it the group's third album to do so. Billboard Japan recorded 133,163 copies sold and 1,903 downloads of the album.

Track listing

Charts

Weekly charts

Year-end charts

Certifications

References

2019 albums
Twice (group) albums
Warner Music Japan albums
Japanese-language albums